Sanayev is a Russian surname created from the surname Alexander, and its female form is Sanayeva. Notable people with the surname include:

Elena Sanayeva (born 1942), Soviet and Russian actress and social activist
Nurislam Sanayev (born 1991), Kazakh freestyle wreslter
Vsevolod Sanayev (1912-1996), Soviet film and stage actor

Russian-language surnames
Surnames from given names